Marista Rugby Club is a rugby union and field hockey club based in Mendoza, Argentina. The rugby union team is member of the Unión de Rugby de Cuyo and currently plays in Torneo del Oeste league.

History
Marista Rugby Club was founded in 1961 by Marist reverend Primo Brunato. Founded in Mendoza the club has since moved to La Carrodilla, Luján de Cuyo, just outside the city.

The club has strong links with fellow marist clubs: Club Champagnat and Club Manuel Belgrano in Buenos Aires, Club San Luis in La Plata and Mar del Plata's Sporting. Together, these clubs take part in the annual Copa Marista friendly tournament.

Although the club was only founded in 1961, Marista quickly became one of the most successful teams in Mendoza, reaching the top division in 1964 and winning the title two years later. Marista would then go on to dominate cuyano rugby, winning seven titles in succession, between 1966 and 1972.

Overall, the club has won 24 provincial titles and reached the final of the first ever Torneo del Interior in 1998, eventually losing to Jockey Club Córdoba. Marista has recently won the Torneo del Oeste tournament, after defeating Liceo 22-21 in the final.

Titles
Unión de Rugby de Cuyo (25): 1966, 1967, 1968, 1969, 1970, 1971, 1972, 1974, 1976, 1978, 1979, 1980, 1981, 1983, 1984, 1987, 1995, 1998, 1999, 2000, 2006, 2011, 2015, 2019, 2021

References

External links
 Official website
 Unión de Rugby de Cuyo clubs

Argentine rugby union teams
Sport in Mendoza, Argentina
Rugby clubs established in 1961
Argentine field hockey clubs
1961 establishments in Argentina